The mayor of Cagayan de Oro is the head of the local government of the city who elected to three year terms. The Mayor is also the executive head and leads the city's departments in executing the city ordinances and improving public services. The city mayor is restricted to three consecutive terms, totaling nine years, although a mayor can be elected again after an interruption of one term.

Cagayan de Misamis

Post World War II 
 Lucio S. Ramos (1946-1947), on his second term as Municipal Mayor.
 Mariano A. Vélez Sr. (1948),  appointed as Military Mayor entrusted for the post-World War II rehabilitation.

City of Cagayan de Oro 

John L. Elizaga was also mayor for two months in 1998, replacing Mayor Pablo "Ambing" Magtajas who had resigned as mayor to participate in the election. Elizaga's framed photo was included in the gallery of mayors in city hall, but has been reported missing by councilor Edgar Cabanlas during the 23rd regular session of the 20th city council.

See also 
 Justiniano R. Borja

References

Cagayan de Oro
Mayors of Cagayan de Oro